Stolp Synagogue was a synagogue in Stolp, Germany (now Słupsk, Poland). It was built in 1901–1902, designed by Eduard Koch. The synagogue was set on fire by Nazis during the Kristallnacht on 9–10 November 1938. In 2006 an unveiling ceremony was held for a monument commemorating the Jewish community of the city organized by the Foundation for the Preservation of Jewish Heritage in Poland.

References

Former synagogues in Poland
Synagogues destroyed during Kristallnacht (Germany)
Buildings and structures in Słupsk